In stable homotopy theory, a ring spectrum is a spectrum E together with a multiplication map

μ: E ∧ E → E

and a unit map

 η: S → E,

where S is the sphere spectrum. These maps have to satisfy associativity and unitality conditions up to homotopy, much in the same way as the multiplication of a ring is associative and unital. That is,

 μ (id ∧ μ) ∼ μ (μ ∧ id)

and

 μ (id ∧ η) ∼ id ∼ μ(η ∧ id).

Examples of ring spectra include singular homology with coefficients in a ring, complex cobordism, K-theory, and Morava K-theory.

See also 
Highly structured ring spectrum

References

Algebraic topology
Homotopy theory

de:Ringspektrum